Mignani is an Italian surname. Notable people with the surname include:

Gaetano Mignani (1882–1973), Italian Roman Catholic missionary
Michele Mignani (born 1972), Italian footballer and manager

Italian-language surnames